Delias aruna, the golden Jezebel, is a butterfly in the family Pieridae. It is found in Queensland, Irian Jaya, Maluku, Papua New Guinea and several surrounding islands.

The wingspan is 70 mm.

The larvae feed on mistletoe species, especially Dendrophthoe glabrescens. They live and feed in a loose silken web.

Subspecies

 Delias aruna aruna (northern Moluccas, Waigeu, West Irian to northern New Guinea)
 Delias aruna irma Fruhstorfer, 1907 (Papua (Milne Bay))
 Delias aruna inferna Butler, 1871 (Cape York to Coen) - orange Jezabel
 Delias aruna rona Rothschild, 1898 (Roon Island)
 Delias aruna seriata (Bacan)

External links

 Australian Insects
 The Life History of Delias aruna inferna

aruna
Butterflies described in 1832